Baron Saint Leonards, of Slaugham in the County of Sussex, is a title in the Peerage of the United Kingdom. It was created in 1852 for Sir Edward Sugden, Lord Chancellor in Lord Derby's 1852 administration. He was succeeded by his grandson, the second Baron. He was the son of the Honourable Henry Sugden, eldest son of the first Baron. He was succeeded by his nephew, the third Baron. He was the son of the Hon. Henry Frank Sugden, next brother of the second Baron. Upon the early passing of the fourth Baron in 1985, he was succeeded by his cousin, the fifth Baron.

Barons Saint Leonards (1852)
Edward Burtenshaw Sugden, 1st Baron St Leonards (1781–1875)
Hon. Henry Sugden (1811–1866)
Edward Burtenshaw Sugden, 2nd Baron Saint Leonards (1847–1908)
Frank Edward Sugden, 3rd Baron Saint Leonards (1890–1972)
John Gerald Sugden, 4th Baron Saint Leonards (1950–1985)
Charles Sugden Tyson, 5th Baron Saint Leonards (1961–)
Hon. Bradley Sugden Tyson (1995–)

References

Noble titles created in 1852
Noble titles created for UK MPs
1852 establishments in the United Kingdom
Peerages created for the Lord High Chancellor of Great Britain